Denuvo Anti-Tamper is an anti-tamper technology and digital rights management (DRM) system developed by Austrian software company Denuvo Software Solutions GmbH, a subsidiary of Irdeto. The company also developed an anti-cheat counterpart.

History 
Denuvo is developed by Denuvo Software Solutions GmbH, a software company based in Salzburg, Austria. The company was formed through a management buyout of DigitalWorks, the arm of the Sony Digital Audio Disc Corporation that developed the SecuROM DRM technology. It originally employed 45 people. In January 2018, the company was acquired by larger software company Irdeto. Development of the Denuvo software started in 2014. FIFA 15, released in September 2014, was the first game to use Denuvo.

3DM, a Chinese warez group, first claimed to have breached Denuvo's technology in a blog post published on 1 December 2014, wherein they announced that they would release cracked versions of Denuvo-protected games FIFA 15, Dragon Age: Inquisition and Lords of the Fallen. Following onto this, 3DM released the version of Dragon Age: Inquisition about two weeks after that game had shipped. The overall cracking progress took about a month, an unusually long time in the game cracking scene. When asked about this development, Denuvo Software Solutions acknowledged that "every protected game eventually gets cracked". However, technology website Ars Technica noted that most sales for major games happen within 30 days of release, and so publishers may consider Denuvo a success if it meant a game took significantly longer to be cracked. In January 2016, 3DM's founder, Bird Sister, revealed that they were to give up on trying to break the Denuvo implementation for Just Cause 3, and warned that, due to the ongoing trend for the implementation, there would be "no free games to play in the world" in the near future. Subsequently, 3DM opted to not crack any games for one year to examine whether such a move would have any influence on game sales. Denuvo's marketing director, Thomas Goebl, claimed that some console-exclusive games get PC releases due to this technology.

By October 2017, crackers were able to bypass Denuvo's protection within hours of a game's release, with notable examples being South Park: The Fractured but Whole, Middle-earth: Shadow of War, Total War: Warhammer 2 and FIFA 18, all being cracked on their release dates. In another notable case, Assassin's Creed Origins, which wrapped Denuvo within security tool VMProtect as well as Ubisoft's proprietary DRM used for their Uplay distribution software, had its security features bypassed by Italian collective CPY in February 2018, three months after the game's release. In December 2018, Hitman 2 protection was bypassed three days before its official release date due to exclusive pre-order access, drawing comparisons to Final Fantasy XV, which had its protection removed four days before release.

By 2019, several products like Devil May Cry 5, Metro Exodus, Resident Evil 2, Far Cry New Dawn, Football Manager 2019 and Soul Calibur 6, were cracked within their first week of release, with Ace Combat 7 taking thirteen days. In the case of Rage 2, which was released on Steam as well as Bethesda Softworks' own Bethesda Launcher, the Steam version was protected by Denuvo, whereas the Bethesda Launcher version was not, leading to the game being cracked immediately, and Denuvo being removed from the Steam release two days later.

A sister product, Denuvo Anti-Cheat, was announced in March 2019, and first used with Doom Eternal following a patch on 14 May 2020. However, less than a week later Doom developer id Software announced they would be removing it from the game following negative response from players.

On August 24th, 2022, it was announced that Denuvo had developed "Nintendo Switch Emulator Protection", a new digital rights management solution for Nintendo Switch titles which aims to allow developers to block play via emulators such as Yuzu.

Technology 
Games protected by Denuvo require an online activation. According to Empress, a notable Denuvo cracker, the software assigns a unique authentication token to each copy of a game, depending on factors like the user's hardware. The DRM is integrated with the game's code, which makes it especially hard to circumvent.

Criticism 
Denuvo has been criticised for high CPU usage and excessive writing operations on storage components, the latter potentially causing significant life-span reductions for solid-state drives (SSDs). Denuvo Software Solutions has denied both claims. In the case of Tekken 7 and Sonic Mania Plus, Denuvo caused a significant decrease in performance in several parts of these games. Sam Machkovech of Ars Technica reviewed in-depth how Denuvo was causing performance penalties, releasing an article on the matter in December 2018. In December 2018, Joel Hruska of ExtremeTech compared the performance of multiple games with Denuvo enabled and disabled, and found that the games tested had significantly higher frame rates and lower loading times when Denuvo was not used. Richard Leadbetter of Digital Foundry compared the performance of a pirated version of Resident Evil Village which had stripped out Denuvo and Capcom's additional copy protection against the release version for Windows, and found that the DRM-stripped version performed far better than the released game.

In July 2018, Denuvo Software Solutions filed a lawsuit against Voksi, a 21-year-old Bulgarian hacker who had cracked several Denuvo-protected games. Voksi was arrested by Bulgarian authorities, and his website, Revolt, was taken offline.

In May 2020, Kaspersky Anti-Virus detected the now removed Denuvo Anti-Cheat implementation in Doom Eternal as malware, possibly due to its kernel-level access.

In November 2021, many recent games using Denuvo were rendered unplayable, reportedly due to a Denuvo owned domain name expiring. The same month it was discovered that many Denuvo games would not work with Intel 12th Gen Alder Lake CPUs in either Windows 10 or Windows 11. However, as of January 12 2022, the Alder Lake incompatibility issue has been addressed, bringing the list of 90 incompatible titles down to zero.

In August of 2022, Nintendo Switch owners on social media widely criticized the announcement of the "Nintendo Switch Emulator Protection" intended to prevent play of Switch games on emulators, expressing concerns that it would hinder software performance, citing Denuvo DRM's history of being reported as impacting PC gaming performance. However, Denuvo said in statements to the press that it would not negatively impact performance of Switch games for those playing on real console hardware. Denuvo declined to disclose the names of any other companies involved, but claimed that Nintendo was "not involved" and said there had been "strong demand" from software publishers for such a solution, to preclude piracy of Nintendo Switch games enabled through emulation. The statement of Nintendo's non-involvement was met with skepticism from the Switch modding community. The developers of Switch emulator Ryujinx responded to the announcement in a tweet, stating their intention to continue developing the software.

References

External links 
 

2014 software
Digital rights management for Windows
Proprietary software
Video game controversies